Black Lion, Black Lions, or Blacklions may refer to:

Businesses and organisations
 Black Lion, Hammersmith, a London pub
 Black Lion, Kilburn, a London pub
 Black Lion Records, a British jazz record company
 Black Lions Films, associated with ITC Entertainment

Military and politics
 Black Lions, an Ethiopian anti-fascist resistance movement
 Black Lions, nickname of 28th Infantry Regiment (United States)
Operation Black Lion, 1972, in the Laotian Civil War
Operation Black Lion III, 1972–1973
Operation Black Lion V, 1972–1973
 Blacklions, nickname of VFA-213, an aviation unit of the U.S. Navy

Other uses
 The Black Lion, a Georgian rugby union team
 Black Lion, a 2020 album by Stevie Stone
 Black Lion (สิงห์ดำ) a swordman hero character in 1960s Thai comics created by Niwat Taraphan

See also

 Black lion tamarin, a monkey
 Black Lion Crossing Halt railway station, Aberdare, Wales